Automba is an unincorporated community in Automba Township, Carlton County, Minnesota, United States. The community is near Kettle River along Carlton County Road 6.  State Highways 27 (MN 27) and 73 (MN 73) are nearby.  Automba is 18 miles west-northwest of Moose Lake.

Notable person
 Irene Reed (1931-2005), anthropologist and linguist

Further reading
 Official State of Minnesota Highway Map - 2019 edition
 Mn/DOT map of Carlton County – 2019 edition

Unincorporated communities in Carlton County, Minnesota
Unincorporated communities in Minnesota